Arminia Ludwigshafen is a German association football club from the Rheingönheim of the city of Ludwigshafen am Rhein, Rhineland-Palatinate.

History
The club was founded 1 September 1903 as 1. FC Arminia Rheingönheim and enjoyed some success in local level competition prior to the outbreak of World War I.  Under the Nazis it was forced in to a merger with TSG Rheingönheim as part of a process of political consolidation that eliminated worker's clubs like 1. FC, as well as faith-based clubs, as being ideologically unacceptable to the regime. The club was reestablished as VfL Rheingönheim after World War II before once again becoming FC Arminia Rheingönheim on 22 October 1949. In 1969, the association adopted the name of the city of Ludwigshafen.

FC first advanced to the Amateurliga Südwest (III) in 1966 where they would compete for nine seasons with their best result coming as a fourth-place finish in 1969–70. In 1988, after several years in the Bezirksliga Vorderpfalz, Arminia slipped to the Kreisliga and then bounced back and forth between these two levels of play for several seasons. A string of three consecutive promotions saw the club return to the Verbandsliga Südwest (VI) in 2005, and in 2011, they won their way into the Oberliga Südwest (V) for the first time, a league renamed to Oberliga Rheinland-Pfalz/Saar in 2012.

Honours
The club's honours:

League
 Verbandsliga Südwest (VI)
 Champions: 2011
 Landesliga Südwest-Ost (VII)
 Runners-up: 2005
 Bezirksliga Vorderpfalz (VII)
 Champions: 2004

Cup
 South West Cup
 Runners-up: 2013

Recent seasons
The recent season-by-season performance of the club:

With the introduction of the Regionalligas in 1994 and the 3. Liga in 2008 as the new third tier, below the 2. Bundesliga, all leagues below dropped one tier. In 2012 the Oberliga Südwest was renamed Oberliga Rheinland-Pfalz/Saar.

References

External links
 Official team site
 Arminia Ludwigshafen at Weltfussball.de
 Das deutsche Fußball-Archiv historical German domestic league tables 

Football clubs in Germany
Football clubs in Rhineland-Palatinate
Association football clubs established in 1903
1903 establishments in Germany
Sport in Ludwigshafen